This page features a list of biogeographic provinces that were developed by Miklos Udvardy in 1975, later modified by other authors. Biogeographic Province is a biotic subdivision of biogeographic realms subdivided into ecoregions, which are classified based on their biomes or habitat types and, on this page, correspond to the floristic kingdoms of botany.

The provinces represent the large areas of Earth's surface within which organisms have been evolving in relative isolation over long periods of time, separated from one another by geographic features, such as oceans, broad deserts, or high mountain ranges, that constitute barriers to migration.

Biomes are characterized by similar climax vegetation, though each realm may include a number of different biomes. A tropical moist broadleaf forest in Brazil, for example, may be similar to one in New Guinea in its vegetation type and structure, climate, soils, etc., but these forests are inhabited by plants with very different evolutionary histories.

Afrotropical Realm

 Tropical humid forests
 Guinean Rainforest
 Congo Rainforest
 Malagasy Rainforest
 Tropical dry or deciduous forests (incl. Monsoon forests) or woodlands
 West African Woodland/Savanna
 East African Woodland/Savanna
 Congo Woodland/Savanna
 Miombo Woodland/Savanna
 South African Woodland/Savanna
 Malagasy Woodland/Savanna
 Malagasy Thorn Forest
 Evergreen sclerophyllous forests, scrubs or woodlands
 Cape Sclerophyll
 Warm deserts and semideserts
 Western Sahel
 Eastern Sahel
 Somalian
 Namib
 Kalahari
 Karroo
 Mixed mountain and highland systems with complex zonation
 Ethiopian Highlands
 Guinean Highlands
 Central African Highlands
 East African Highlands
 South African Highlands
 Mixed island systems
 Ascension and St. Helena Islands
 Comores Islands and Aldabra
 Mascarene Islands
 Lake systems
 Lake Rudolph
 Lake Ukerewe (Victoria)
 Lake Tanganyika
 Lake Malawi (Nyassa)

Antarctic Realm

 Tundra communities and barren Antarctic desert
 Subtropical and temperate rain forests or woodlands

Australasian Realm

 Tropical humid forests
 Queensland Coastal
 Subtropical and temperate rain forests or woodlands
 Tasmanian
 Tropical dry or deciduous forests (incl. Monsoon forests) or woodlands
 Northern Coastal
 Evergreen sclerophyllous forests, scrubs or woodlands
 Western Sclerophyll
 Eastern Sclerophyll
 Brigalow
 Warm deserts and semideserts
 Western Mulga
 Central Desert
 Southern Mulga/Saltbush
 Tropical grasslands and savannas
 Northern Savanna
 Northern Grasslands
 Temperate grasslands
 Eastern Grasslands and Savannas

Indomalayan Realm

 Tropical humid forests
 Malabar Rainforest
 Ceylonese Rainforest
 Bengalian Rainforest
 Burman Rainforest
 Indochinese Rainforest
 South Chinese Rainforest
 Malayan Rainforest
 Tropical dry or deciduous forests (incl. Monsoon forests) or woodlands
 Indus-Ganges Monsoon Forest
 Burma Monsoon Forest
 Thailandian Monsoon Forest
 Mahanadian
 Coromandel
 Ceylonese Monsoon Forest
 Deccan Thorn Forest
 Warm deserts and semideserts
 Thar Desert
 Mixed island systems
 Seychelles and Amirantes Islands
 Laccadives Islands
 Maldives and Chagos Islands
 Cocos-Keeling and Christmas Islands
 Andaman and Nicobar Islands
 Sumatra
 Java
 Lesser Sunda Islands
 Celebes
 Borneo
 Philippines
 Taiwan

Nearctic Realm

 Subtropical and temperate rain forests or woodlands
 Sitkan
 Oregonian
 Temperate needle-leaf forests or woodlands
 Yukon Taiga
 Canadian Taiga
 Temperate broad-leaf forests or woodlands, and subpolar deciduous thickets
 Eastern Forest
 Austroriparian
 Evergreen sclerophyllous forests, scrubs or woodlands
 Californian
 Warm deserts and semideserts
 Sonoran
 Chihuahuan
 Tamaulipan
 Cold-winter (continental) deserts and semideserts
 Great Basin
 Tundra communities and barren Arctic desert
 Aleutian Islands
 Alaskan Tundra
 Canadian Tundra
 Arctic Archipelago
 Greenland Tundra
 Arctic Desert and Icecap
 Temperate grasslands
 Grasslands
 Mixed mountain and highland systems with complex zonation
 Rocky Mountains
 Sierra-Cascade
 Madrean-Cordilleran
 Lake systems
 Great Lakes

Neotropical Realm

 Tropical humid forests
 Campechean
 Panamanian
 Colombian Coastal
 Guayanan
 Amazon rainforest
 Madeiran
 Serra do Mar (Bahian coast)
 Subtropical and temperate rain forests or woodlands
 Brazilian Rainforest (Brazilian Deciduous Forest)
 Brazilian Planalto (Brazilian Araucaria Forest)
 Valdivian Forest (Chilean Temperate Rain Forest)
 Chilean Nothofagus
 Tropical dry or deciduous forests (incl. Monsoon forests) or woodlands
 Everglades
 Sinaloan
 Guerreran
 Yucatecan (Yucatán)
 Central American (Carib-Pacific)
 Venezuelan Dry Forest
 Venezuelan Deciduous Forest
 Ecuadoran Dry Forest
 Caatinga
 Gran Chaco
 Temperate broad-leaf forests or woodlands, and subpolar deciduous thickets
 Chilean Araucaria Forest
 Evergreen sclerophyllous forests, scrubs or woodlands
 Chilean Sclerophyll
 Warm deserts and semideserts
 Pacific Desert (Peruvian and Atacama Desert)
 Monte (Argentinian Thorn-scrub)
 Cold-winter (continental) deserts and semideserts
 Patagonian
 Tropical grasslands and savannas
 Llanos
 Campos Limpos (Guyana highlands)
 Babacu
 Campos Cerrados (Campos)
 Temperate grasslands
 Argentinian Pampas (Pampas)
 Uruguayan Pampas
 Mixed mountain and highland systems with complex zonation
 Northern Andean
 Colombian Montane
 Yungas (Andean cloud forest)
 Puna
 Southern Andean
 Mixed island systems
 Bahamas-Bermudan
 Cuban
 Greater Antillean (Jamaica, Hispaniola and Puerto Rico)
 Lesser Antillean
 Revillagigedo Archipelago
 Cocos Island
 Galapagos Islands
 Fernando de Noronha Island
 South Trindade Island
 Lake systems
 Lake Titicaca

Oceanian Realm

 Mixed island systems
 Papuan
 Micronesian
 Hawaiian
 Southeastern Polynesian
 Central Polynesian
 New Caledonian
 East Melanesian

Palearctic Realm

 Subtropical and temperate rain forests or woodlands
 Chinese Subtropical Forest
 Japanese Evergreen Forest (Japanese Subtropical Forest)
 Temperate needle-leaf forests or woodlands
 West Eurasian Taiga
 East Siberian Taiga
 Temperate broad-leaf forests or woodlands, and subpolar deciduous thickets
 Icelandic
 Subarctic Birchwoods
 Kamchatkan
 British Isles (British and Irish Forest)
 Atlantic (West European Forest)
 Boreonemoral (Baltic Lowland)
 Middle European Forest (East European Mixed Forest)
 Pannonian (Danubian Steppe)
 West Anatolian
 Manchu-Japanese Mixed Forest
 Oriental Deciduous Forest
 Evergreen sclerophyllous forests, scrubs or woodlands
 Iberian Highlands
 Mediterranean Sclerophyll
 Warm deserts and semideserts
 Sahara
 Arabian Desert (Arabia)
 Anatolian-Iranian Desert (Turkish-Iranian Scrub-steppe)
 Cold-winter (continental) deserts and semideserts
 Turanian (Kazakh Desert Scrub-steppe)
 Talka-Makan-Gobi Desert
 Tibetan
 Iranian Desert
 Tundra communities and barren Arctic desert
 Arctic Desert
 Higharctic Tundra
 Lowarctic Tundra
 Temperate grasslands
 Atlas Steppe (Atlas Highlands)
 Pontian Steppe (Ukraine-Kazakh Steppe)
 Mongolian-Manchurian Steppe (Gobi-Manchurian Steppe)
 Mixed mountain and highland systems with complex zonation
 Scottish Highlands
 Central European Highlands
 Balkan Highlands
 Caucaso-Iranian Highlands (Caucasus and Kurdistan-Iran Highlands)
 Altai Highlands
 Pamir-Tian Shan Highlands
 Hindu Kush Highlands
 Himalayan Highlands
 Szechwan Highlands
 Mixed island systems
 Macaronesian Islands
 Ryukyu Islands
 Lake systems
 Lake Ladoga
 Aral Sea
 Lake Baikal

Region coding
The hierarchy of the scheme is (with early replaced terms in parenthesis):
 biogeographic realm (= biogeographic regions and subregions), with 8 categories
 biogeographic province (= biotic province), with 193 categories, each characterized by a major biome or biome-complex
 biome, with 14 types: tropical humid forests (1); subtropical and temperate rain forests or woodlands (2); temperate needle-leaf forests or woodlands (3); tropical dry of deciduous forests (including monsoon forests) or woodlands (4); temperate broad-lead forests or woodlands and subpolar deciduous thickets (5); evergreen sclerophyllous forests, scrubs or woodlands (6); warm deserts and semideserts (7); cold-winter (continental) deserts and semideserts (8); tundra communities and barren arctic desert (9); tropical grassland and savannas (10); temperate grasslands (11); mixed mountain and highland systems with complex zonation (12); mixed island systems (13); lake systems (14).

So, for example, the Australian Central Desert province is in the Australasian realm (6), is the 9th biogeographic province in that realm, and its biome falls within "warm deserts and semideserts" (7), so it is coded 6.9.7.

The realms and provinces of the scheme are hence coded as follows:

 1.1.2 Sitkan province
 1.2.2. Oregonian province
 1.3.3 Yukon taiga province
 1.4.3 Canadian taiga province
 1.5.5. Eastern forest province
 1.6.5 Austroriparian province
 1.7.6 Californian province
 1.8.7 Sonoran province
 1.9.7 Chihuahuan province
 1.10.7 Tamaulipan province
 1.11.8 Great Basin province
 1.12.9 Aleutian Islands province
 1.13.9 Alaskan tundra province
 1.14.9 Canadian tundra province
 1.15.9 Arctic Archipelago province
 1.16.9 Greenland tundra province
 1.17.9 Arctic desert and icecap province
 1.18.11 Grasslands province
 1.19.12 Rocky Mountains province
 1.20.12 Sierra-Cascade province
 1.21.12 Madrean-Cordilleran province
 1.22.14 Great Lakes province

 2.1.2. Chinese Subtropical Forest province
 2.2.2 Japanese Evergreen Forest province (= Japanese Subtropical Forest)
 2.3.3 West Eurasian Taiga province
 2.4.3 East Siberian Taiga province
 2.5.5 Icelandian province (= Iceland)
 2.6.5 Subarctic Birchwoods province
 2.7.5 Kamchatkan province
 2.8.5 British Islands province (= British + Irish Forest) 
 2.9.5 Atlantic province (West European Forest, in part) 
 2.10.5 Boreonemoral province (Baltic Lowland, in part) 
 2.11.5 Middle European Forest province (= East European Mixed Forest)
 2.12.5 Pannonian province (= Danubian Steppe)
 2.13.5 West Anatolian province
 2.14.5 Manchu-Japanese Mixed Forest province (= Manchurian + Japanese Mixed Forest)
 2.15.6 Oriental Deciduous Forest province
 2.16.6 Iberian Highlands province
 2.17.7 Mediterranean Sclerophyll province
 2.18.7 Sahara province
 2.19.7 Arabian Desert province (= Arabia) 
 2.20.8 Anatolian-Iranian Desert province (= Turkish-Iranian Scrub-steppe) 
 2.21.8 Turanian province (= Kazakh Desert Scrub-steppe)
 2.22.8 Takla-Makan-Gobi Desert steppe province
 2.23.8 Tibetan province
 2.24.9 Iranian Desert province
 2.25.9 Arctic Desert province
 2.26.9 Higharctic Tundra province (= Eurasian Tundra, in part) 
 2.27.11 Lowarctic Tundra province (= Eurasian Tundra, in part) 
 2.28.11 Atlas Steppe province (= Atlas Highlands) 
 2.29.11 Pontian Steppe province (= Ukraine-Kazakh Steppe) 
 2.30.11 Mongolian-Manchurian Steppe province (= Gobi + Manchurian Steppe) 
 2.31.12 Scottish Highlands Highlands province
 2.32.12 Central European Highlands province
 2.33.12 Balkan Highlands province
 2.34.12 Caucaso-Iranian Highlands (= Caucasus + Kurdistan-Iran) province
 2.35.12 Altai Highlands province
 2.36.12 Pamir-Tian-Shan Highlands province
 2.37.12 Hindu Kush Highlands province
 2.38.12 Himalayan Highlands province
 2.39.12 Szechwan Highlands province
 2.40.13 Macaronesian Islands province (= 4 island provinces)
 2.41.13 Ryukyu Islands province
 2.42.14 Lake Ladoga province
 2.43.14 Aral Sea province
 2.44.14 Lake Baikal province

 3.1.1 Guinean Rain Forest province
 3.2.1 Congo Rain Forest province
 3.3.1 Malagasy Rain Forest province
 3.4.4 West African Woodland/savanna province
 3.5.4 East African Woodland/savanna province
 3.6.4 Congo Woodland/savanna province
 3.7.4 Miombo Woodland/savanna province
 3.8.4 South African Woodland/savanna province
 3.9.4 Malagasy Woodland/savanna province
 3.10.4 Malagasy Thorn Forest province
 3.11.6 Cape Sclerophyll province
 3.12.7 Western Sahel province
 3.13.7 Eastern Sahel province
 3.14.7 Somalian province
 3.15.7 Namib province
 3.16.7 Kalahari province
 3.17.7 Karroo province
 3.18.12 Ethiopian Highlands province
 3.19.12 Guinean Highlands province
 3.20.12 Central African Highlands province
 3.21.12 East African Highlands province
 3.22.12 South African Highlands province
 3.23.13 Ascension and St. Helena Islands province
 3.24.13 Comores Islands and Aldabra province
 3.25.13 Mascarene Islands province
 3.26.14 Lake Rudolf province
 3.27.14 Lake Ukerewe (Victoria) province
 3.28.14 Lake Tanganyika province
 3.29.14 Lake Malawi (Nyasa) province

 4.1.1   Malabar Rainforest province
 4.2.1   Ceylonese Rainforest province
 4.3.1   Bengalian Rainforest province 
 4.4.1   Burman Rainforest province
 4.5.1   Indochinese Rainforest province
 4.6.1   South Chinese Rainforest province
 4.7.1   Malayan Rainforest province
 4.8.4   Indus-Ganges Monsoon Forest province
 4.9.4   Burma Monsoon Forest province
 4.10.4  Thailandian Monsoon Forest province
 4.11.4  Mahanadian province
 4.12.4  Coromandel province
 4.13.4  Ceylonese Monsoon Forest province
 4.14.4  Deccan Thorn Forest province
 4.15.7  Thar Desert province
 4.16.12 Seychelles and Amirantes Islands province
 4.17.12 Laccadives Islands province
 4.18.12 Maldives and Chagos Islands province
 4.19.12 Cocos-Keeling and Christmas Islands province
 4.20.12 Andaman and Nicobar Islands province
 4.21.12 Sumatra province
 4.22.12 Java province
 4.23.12 Lesser Sunda Islands province
 4.24.12 Celebes province
 4.25.12 Borneo province
 4.26.12 Philippines province
 4.27.12 Taiwan province

 5.1.13 Papuan province
 5.2.13 Micronesian province
 5.3.13 Hawaiian province
 5.4.13 Southeastern Polynesian province
 5.5.13 Central Polynesian province
 5.6.13 New Caledonian province
 5.7.13 East-Melanesian province

 6.1.1 Queensland Coastal province
 6.2.2 Tasmanian province
 6.3.4 Northern Coastal province
 6.4.6 Western Sclerophyll province
 6.5.6 Southern Sclerophyll province
 6.6.6 Eastern Sclerophyll province≠
 6.7.6 Brigalow province
 6.8.7 Western Mulga province
 6.9.7 Central Desert province
 6.10.7 Southern Mulga/Saltbush province
 6.11.10 Northern Savanna province
 6.12.10 Northern Grasslands province
 6.13.11 Eastern Grasslands and Savannas province

 7.1.2 Neozealandia province
 7.2.9 Maudlandia province
 7.3.9 Marielandia province
 7.4.9 Insulantarctica province

 8.1.1 Campechean province (= Campeche)
 8.2.1 Panamanian province
 8.3.1 Colombian Coastal province
 8.4.1. Guyanese province
 8.5.1 Amazonian province
 8.6.1. Madeiran province
 8.7.1 Serra do mar province (= Bahian coast)
 8.8.2 Brazilian Rain Forest province (= Brazilian Deciduous Forest)
 8.9.2 Brazilian Planalto province (= Brazilian Araucaria Forest)
 8.10.2 Valdivian Forest province (= Chilean Temperate Rain Forest, in part)
 8.11.2 Chilean Nothofagus province (= Chilean Temperate Rain Forest, in part)
 8.12.4 Everglades province
 8.13.4 Sinaloan province
 8.14.4 Guerreran province
 8.15.4 Yucatecan province (= Yucatán)
 8.16.4 Central American province (= Carib-Pacific)
 8.17.4 Venezuelan Dry Forest province
 8.18.4 Venezuelan Deciduous Forest province
 8.19.4 Ecuadorian Dry Forest province
 8.20.4 Caatinga province
 8.21.4 Gran Chaco province
 8.22.5 Chilean Araucaria Forest province
 8.23.6 Chilean Sclerophyll province
 8.24.7 Pacific Desert province (= Peruvian + Atacama Desert)
 8.25.7 Monte (= Argentinian Thorn-scrub) province
 8.26.8 Patagonian province
 8.27.10 Llanos province
 8.28.10 Campos Limpos province (= Guyana highlands)
 8.29.10 Babacu province
 8.30.10 Campos Cerrados province (= Campos)
 8.31.11 Argentinian Pampas province (= Pampas)
 8.32.11 Uruguayan Pampas province
 8.33.12 Northern Andean province (= Northern Andes)
 8.34.12 Colombian Montane province
 8.35.12 Yungas province (= Andean cloud forest)
 8.36.12 Puna province
 8.37.12 Southern Andean province (= Southern Andes)
 8.38.13 Bahamas-Bermudan province (= Bahamas + Bermuda)
 8.39.13 Cuban province
 8.40.13 Greater Aritillean province (= Jamaica + Hispaniola + Puerto Rico)
 8.41.13 Lesser Antillean province (= Lesser Antilles)
 8.42.13 Revilla Gigedo Island province
 8.43.13 Cocos Island province
 8.44.13 Galapagos Islands province
 8.45.13 Fernando de Noronja Island province
 8.46.13 South Trinidade Island province
 8.47.14 Lake Titicaca province

See also
 Biogeographic provinces of hydrothermal vent systems
 Floristic province
 List of ecoregions

References

Bibliography
 Dassman, Raymond (1976). "Biogeographical Provinces". CoEvolution Quarterly, Number 11, Fall 1976.

Biogeography
Ecoregions
Floristic provinces
Floristic regions
Landscape ecology
Ecology
Physical geography